{{Automatic taxobox
| taxon = Buccinanopsidae
| image = 
| image_caption = 
| authority = Galindo, Puillandre, Lozouet & Bouchet, 2016
| synonyms_ref = 
| synonyms = Buccinanopsinae Galindo, Puillandre, Lozouet & Bouchet, 2016  (original rank)
| type_genus= 
| type_genus_authority = 
| subdivision_ranks = Genera
| subdivision = See text
}}

The Buccinanopsidae are a taxonomic family of large sea snails, often known as whelks in the superfamily Buccinoidea.

Genera
 Buccinanops d'Orbigny, 1841
 Buccinastrum'' Pastorino & Simone, 2021

References

External links
 Galindo, L. A.; Puillandre, N.; Utge, J.; Lozouet, P.; Bouchet, P. (2016). The phylogeny and systematics of the Nassariidae revisited (Gastropoda, Buccinoidea). Molecular Phylogenetics and Evolution. 99: 337-353
 Kantor, Y.I., Fedosov, A.E., Kosyan, A.R., Puillandre, N., Sorokin, P.A., Kano, Y., Clark, R. & Bouchet, P. (2021). Molecular phylogeny and revised classification of the Buccinoidea (Neogastropoda). Zoological Journal of the Linnean Society. 1-69

Buccinoidea